Bruce Evans was an American Negro league outfielder in the 1910s.

Evans played for the All Nations club in 1916. In six recorded games, he posted four hits in 25 plate appearances.

References

External links
Baseball statistics and player information from Baseball-Reference Black Baseball Stats and Seamheads

Year of birth missing
Year of death missing
Place of birth missing
Place of death missing
All Nations players
Baseball outfielders